Rawinda Prajongjai (born 29 June 1993) is a Thai badminton player. She was part of the national women's team that clinched the gold medal at the 2015, 2017 and 2019 Southeast Asian Games, also won the women's doubles title in 2017. Started her career as a singles player, she won her first international title at the 2013 Smiling Fish International tournament. She later focused on playing in doubles, and won her first Grand Prix tournament in 2015 Vietnam Open teamed-up with Jongkolphan Kititharakul.

Achievements

Southeast Asian Games 
Women's doubles

BWF World Tour (3 titles, 4 runners-up) 
The BWF World Tour, which was announced on 19 March 2017 and implemented in 2018, is a series of elite badminton tournaments sanctioned by the Badminton World Federation (BWF). The BWF World Tour is divided into levels of World Tour Finals, Super 1000, Super 750, Super 500, Super 300, and the BWF Tour Super 100.

Women's doubles

BWF Grand Prix (3 titles, 2 runners-up) 
The BWF Grand Prix had two levels, the Grand Prix and Grand Prix Gold. It was a series of badminton tournaments sanctioned by the Badminton World Federation (BWF) and played between 2007 and 2017.

Women's doubles

  BWF Grand Prix Gold tournament
  BWF Grand Prix tournament

BWF International Challenge/Series (4 titles, 1 runner-up) 
Women's singles

Women's doubles

  BWF International Challenge tournament
  BWF International Series tournament

References

External links 
 

1993 births
Living people
Rawinda Prajongjai
Rawinda Prajongjai
Badminton players at the 2020 Summer Olympics
Rawinda Prajongjai
Badminton players at the 2018 Asian Games
Rawinda Prajongjai
Asian Games medalists in badminton
Medalists at the 2018 Asian Games
Competitors at the 2015 Southeast Asian Games
Competitors at the 2017 Southeast Asian Games
Competitors at the 2019 Southeast Asian Games
Competitors at the 2021 Southeast Asian Games
Rawinda Prajongjai
Southeast Asian Games medalists in badminton
Rawinda Prajongjai
Universiade medalists in badminton
Medalists at the 2013 Summer Universiade
Medalists at the 2015 Summer Universiade
Rawinda Prajongjai